Sphaerodeltis is a genus of moths of the family Crambidae. It contains only one species, Sphaerodeltis psammoleuca, which is found in the Democratic Republic of Congo.

References

Natural History Museum Lepidoptera genus database

Crambinae
Taxa named by Edward Meyrick
Monotypic moth genera
Moths of Africa
Crambidae genera